Lincat is an industrial catering and foodservice equipment company based in Lincolnshire that is represented on the Alternative Investment Market. The company claims to be the UK's leading manufacturer of commercial catering equipment.

History
Lincat Ltd was founded in 1971 in North Hykeham, Lincolnshire. The company began manufacturing electrically heated large-scale cooking equipment. From 1988 Lincat introduced gas-heated cooking equipment. The company was floated on the Unlisted Securities Market in 1988, then on to the LSE in 1994 and to the Alternative Investment Market on 20 August 2007.

The company moved to its present-day 12,000 sq metre manufacturing facility in 1997. In 1998 the factory was formally opened by the Duke of Edinburgh. The site includes a gym for staff use

In 2011, Lincat became an Official Supplier of catering equipment for the WorldSkills Cooking Competition 2011 in London.

Acquisitions
It bought IMC in December 1994 and Britannia in November 2002. Heydal, a kitchen ventilation manufacturer, was bought in March 2007 for £0.4 million and merged with the Britannia brand. It sold Mercury Appliances to Aga Rangemaster for £0.4 million in August 2009.

Structure
It is situated in North Hykeham, not far from the A46 bypass, on Whisby Road near the junction with Kingsley Road, near the Hotel Ibis and just south of the district (North Kesteven) boundary with Lincoln.

It is a member of the Catering Equipment Suppliers Association.

Divisions
Other divisions of the company are
 IMC - based on the Wrexham Industrial Estate
 Britannia Kitchen Ventilation - based on the Sydenham Industrial Estate in Leamington Spa

Products
It makes the full range of cooking and food preparation equipment for professional use (heavy duty), on a corporate scale. It has the Silverlink brand. It has won Caterer and Hotelkeeper awards. Lincat Group has market capitalisation of around £32m. It claims to sell over 2000 finished products and spares weekly. There are more than 450 items in its product range.

Types of equipment it makes are:

 Bain-maries
 Bake off ovens
 Convection ovens
 Conveyor toasters
 Deep fryers
 Electric fly killers
 Food steamers
 Griddles
 Grilling equipment
 Pizza ovens

 Roasting oven
 Sandwich toasters
 Sinks
 Water boilers
 UV Pass Through Steriliser Box

Services
It trains commercial cooks how to use its products on-site.

See also
 Aga Rangemaster Group
 Enodis
 IMI plc

References

External links
 The Lincat website
 New Range of Pizza Ovens
 Four day week in November 2008
 IMC moves to Wrexham in December 2006

Companies based in Lincolnshire
Manufacturing companies established in 1971
Manufacturing companies of the United Kingdom
Cooking appliance brands
Kitchenware brands
Companies listed on the Alternative Investment Market
Engineering companies of the United Kingdom
North Kesteven District
1971 establishments in England
English brands